Massive Aggressive is the fourth studio album by American thrash metal band Municipal Waste. It was released on August 25, 2009 through Earache Records. The album artwork was done by Andrei Bouzikov, bassist of Deadfall.

Track listing

Personnel
Tony Foresta: Lead Vocals
Ryan Waste:Guitars
"Land Phil": Bass, Backing Vocals
Dave Witte: Drums

References

2009 albums
Municipal Waste (band) albums
Earache Records albums
Albums produced by Chris "Zeuss" Harris